The 2016–17 Benevento Calcio season was the club's 88th season and the club's second consecutive season in the second division of Italian football. In addition to the domestic league, Benevento participated in this season's edition of the Coppa Italia. The season covered the period from 1 July 2016 to 30 June 2017.

Players

Competitions

Overall record

Serie B

League table

Results summary

Matches

Promotion play-offs

Coppa Italia

References 

Benevento Calcio seasons
Benevento